Wojciech Mickunas (born 16 March 1947) is a Polish equestrian. He competed in two events at the 1972 Summer Olympics.

References

1947 births
Living people
Polish male equestrians
Olympic equestrians of Poland
Equestrians at the 1972 Summer Olympics
People from Konin County
Sportspeople from Greater Poland Voivodeship
20th-century Polish people